Converse A. Chellis III (born August 10, 1943) is an American politician and accountant who served as the Treasurer of South Carolina and as a member of the South Carolina House of Representatives from 1996 to 2006.

Early life and education 
Chellis was born and raised in Summerville, South Carolina. He earned a Bachelor of Science degree from The Citadel and served as a captain in the United States Air Force.

Career 
Prior to entering politics, Chellis worked as a Certified Public Accountant. In 1996, he was elected to the 94th district in the South Carolina House of Representatives, serving for 10 years. On August 3, 2007, Chellis was selected to serve as Treasurer of South Carolina by the South Carolina General Assembly, replacing Thomas Ravenel. In 2011, he was succeeded by Curtis Loftis.

Personal life 
Chellis and his wife, Tiffany, have two children. His son, Con Chellis, is a member of the South Carolina House of Representatives.

References 

Living people
1943 births
People from Summerville, South Carolina
Republican Party members of the South Carolina House of Representatives
State treasurers of South Carolina
American accountants
United States Air Force officers
20th-century American politicians
21st-century American politicians